Tribulus occidentalis, common name perennial caltrop, is a species of flowering plant in the family Zygophyllaceae, which is native to Australia, and found in Western Australia, Queensland, South Australia and the Northern Territory. (However, Robyn Barker asserts that it is confined to the west coast of Western Australia.) 

It is a prostrate perennial herb, covered in long shaggy haris and growing from 2 cm to 10 cm high. The leaves occur in pairs, and have leaflets in 7 - 10 pairs. It grows on sandy soils and its yellow flowers can be seen from February to November.

It was first described in 1849 by Robert Brown, from a specimen collected on the "west coast of Australia, or on some of its islands, in the Voyage of the Beagle." There are no synonyms.

References

External links
Tribulus occidentalis occurrence data from the [[Australasian Virtual Herbarium

Plants described in 1849
Taxa named by Carl Linnaeus
Flora of Mexico
cistoides